Nude on the Moon: The B-52's Anthology is a two-CD compilation album containing 35 songs recorded by American new wave band the B-52's between the years 1979 and 1998. This compilation includes live recordings of "Quiche Lorraine" and "Whammy Kiss", and a previously unreleased outtake version of "Queen of Las Vegas". The title is a reference to the 1961 film of the same name.

Track listing
All information as per liner notes.

Disc one

Disc two

Personnel
All information as per liner notes.

The B-52's
Kate Pierson – vocals, keyboards, keyboard bass, guitar, bird calls
Fred Schneider – vocals, keyboard bass, toy piano, percussion, walkie talkie
Keith Strickland – vocals, guitars, keyboards, keyboard bass, bass, sitar, harmonica, marimba, drums, percussion, programming, Claire sounds
Cindy Wilson – vocals, bongos, tambourine, guitar
Ricky Wilson – vocals, guitar, keyboards, keyboard bass, bass, smoke alarm

Additional musicians

Pat Irwin – guitar, keyboards (disc 1, tracks 12, 18; disc 2, tracks 14, 17)
Tracy Wormworth – bass (disc 1, track 12; disc 2, track 15)
Zachary Alford – drums (disc 1, tracks 12, 18; disc 2, track 14)
David Byrne – guitar (disc 1, track 13)
Steve Scales – percussion (disc 1, tracks 13, 14)
Yogi Horton – drums (disc 1, track 14)
Sara Lee – bass, keyboards, backing vocals (disc 1, track 18; disc 2, tracks 7–14, 17)
Richard Hilton – keyboards (disc 2, tracks 7, 8, 10, 13, 15), programming (disc 2, tracks 7, 8, 10, 13)
Tommy Mandel – keyboards (disc 2, tracks 7, 8, 10, 13)
Philippe Saisse – keyboards (disc 2, tracks 7, 8, 10, 13)
Leroy Clouden – drums (disc 2, tracks 7, 8, 10, 13)
Sonny Emory – drums (disc 2, tracks 7, 8, 10, 13)
Steve Ferrone – drums (disc 2, tracks 7, 8, 10, 13)
Jamie Muhoberac – keyboards (disc 2, track 14)
Charley Drayton – drums (disc 2, tracks 9, 11, 12, 17)
Uptown Horns – horns (disc 2, tracks 9, 11, 12)
Lenny Castro – percussion (disc 2, track 14)
David McMurray – sax (disc 2, track 14)
Sterling Campbell – drums (disc 2, track 15)

Technical

Chris Blackwell – producer (disc 1, tracks 1–6)
Robert Ash – engineer (disc 1, tracks 1–6)
Rhett Davies – co-producer (disc 1, tracks 7–11), engineer (disc 1, tracks 7–11)
Tom Durack – engineer (disc 1, track 12; disc 2, tracks 7, 8, 10, 13, 18), mixer (disc 1, track 13; disc 2, tracks 7–13, 16, 18), co-producer (disc 2, track 17)
David Byrne – producer (disc 1, tracks 13–14)
Butch Jones – engineer (disc 1, tracks 13–14)
Steven Stanley – producer, engineer (disc 1, tracks 15–17)
The B-52's – producer (disc 1, track 18), co-producer (disc 2, track 17)
Tony Mansfield – producer (disc 2, tracks 1–6)
Tony Phillips – engineer (disc 2, tracks 1–6)
Steve Peck – engineer (disc 2, tracks 1–6)
Michael Hutchinson – engineer (disc 2, tracks 1–6)
Shep Pettibone – additional production (disc 2, tracks 1, 4), remixer (disc 2, track 1)  
Nile Rodgers – producer (disc 2, tracks 7, 8, 10, 13), mixer (disc 2, tracks 7, 8, 10, 13)
Don Was – producer (disc 2, tracks 9, 11, 12, 16)
Dave Cook – engineer (disc 2, tracks 9, 11, 12)
Ed Cherney – mixer (disc 2, track 16)
Moby – remix & additional production (disc 2, track 16)
Patrick Dillett – engineer, mixer (disc 2, track 18)

Compilation
Bradford Cobb & Gary Stewart – compilation producers
Hillary Bratton – compilation assistance
Bill Inglot – sound producer
Dan Hersch & Bill Inglot – remastering 
Jo Motta – product management
Reggie Collins – discographical annotation
Shawn Amos & Leigh Hall – liner notes
Julee Stover & Steven Chean – editorial supervision
Julie Vlasak & Hugh Brown – art direction/design
Lynn Goldsmith – cover photos
Amy Utstein & Randy Perry – project assistance

References

The B-52's compilation albums
Albums produced by Nile Rodgers
Albums produced by Don Was
Albums produced by Rhett Davies
Albums produced by David Byrne
Albums produced by Chris Blackwell
2002 compilation albums
Rhino Entertainment compilation albums